Fort Defiance is a 1951 American Western film directed by John Rawlins and written by Louis Lantz. The film stars Dane Clark, Ben Johnson, Peter Graves, Tracey Roberts, George Cleveland and Ralph Sanford. The film was released on October 9, 1951, by United Artists.

Plot
Ben Shelby rides up to a cattle ranch outside Fort Defiance, Arizona, looking for Johnny Tallon. He meets Johnny's brother, Ned, who informs him that according to a letter Johnny had written just after the end of the Civil War, he should be home soon. As they are talking, the horse Ned has been trying to saddle rears up; he falls and Ben saves him from being trampled. When he asks Ned why he did not get out of the way, Ned reveals that he is blind.

When Ned's uncle Charlie rides up, Ned introduces Ben as a friend of Johnny's. Charlie is grateful that Ned was unhurt by the horse, but is fairly intent on Ben leaving quickly. After Ben helps run off two army veterans who show up trying to cheat Charlie and Ned out of a fair price for some cattle, Ben suggests he could stay to wait for Johnny and help the two men run the ranch. Out of Ned's earshot, Charlie tells Ben he would appreciate him not telling Ned the truth about Johnny. Ben says he has no intention of talking about Johnny Tallon.

Weeks pass and Johnny does not show up; Ben and Ned become better acquainted and Charlie is pleased with Ben's work. One day, Ned tells Ben about his ideas for the future, after Johnny returns, which include Ben becoming a partner or building his own house on property nearby. Ben is dismissive of these plans and this angers Ned, who says that, though he cannot see, he knows that something is "eatin'" Ben and he would like to know what it is. Charlie interrupts this conversation, having returned from Fort Defiance, with news that Johnny has been shot dead while robbing a bank. Charlie then admits to Ned that he kept the truth about his brother from him, that since the end of the war he has been a gun-slinger and a robber. Now Ned understands that Ben came to kill Johnny and demands to know why. Ben reveals that he is the only survivor from his company of Arizona Volunteers which was wiped out at the Battle of Tennessee Ridge, three weeks before the war ended, due to a treasonous act by Johnny Tallon. Ben's own brother was also killed in this battle.

Later, in a saloon in the town of Fort Defiance, Ben begins writing a letter to his wife, Jane, to let her know he is finally coming home. As he considers his future, however, he decides to buy 250 head of cattle and throw in with Ned and Charlie after all. He writes to Jane asking her to catch the next stage to Fort Defiance. The three set up a Christmas tree in anticipation of her arrival and look forward to their prosperous future together. Then, Dave Parker, owner of the saloon and the biggest ranch in the area, rides up with a group of men. Ben had left behind in the saloon a half-written letter to his wife, in which he had mentioned Johnny and the Tennessee Ridge disaster; this letter has been brought to Parker's attention. He lost two brothers in that battle and now is ruthless in aiming to even things up a little by killing Ned Tallon. A gunfight ensues and, while Charlie tries to hold the men off, Ben and Ned ride away. Charlie is killed. A pursuit sees Ned and Ben ride into Navajo Canyon, where there is extreme danger because the government is about to move the Indians to a reservation. Parker calls off the chase, content to wait, and sends three men back to bury Charlie.

While Parker's men are engaged in that task, a man who is shortly revealed to be Johnny Tallon, accompanied by a pal, Hankey, comes along. He extracts information from them concerning both Ned's whereabouts and how their uncle was killed. Johnny kills two of the men and tells the third one to inform Parker that Johnny Tallon is alive. Johnny and Hankey begin trailing Ned and Ben. During a break in their ride across the canyon, Ned tells Ben how Johnny had received a huge scar on his hand, fighting Parker's sons when they came after Ned in the saloon, beating him so badly he lost his sight. Ned hears horses approaching, when Ben goes out to see who it is, he finds out it is Johnny. They have a fistfight which is stopped only when Hankey notices Indians some distance away. At first, Ned is unaware that his brother is there but, as the Indians move in to attack, he and Johnny struggle to silence a horse and Ned feels the scar. He demands to know if the story about Tennessee Ridge is true. After the Indians are dispatched, a fight during which Hankey is killed, Johnny explains that he had known the war was about to end and simply decided he was not going to die at that point for no reason. Johnny has money, from a robbery, to take Ned to San Francisco for eye surgery; Ned refuses to use ill-gotten money.

As the three make their way through the canyon, the tension between Ben and Johnny remains. They spot a stagecoach being chased by Indians and move in to help fight them off. Ben discovers that Jane may have been one of the passengers who decided not to risk the trip due to the Indian issue. On board is Julie, a dance hall girl, whom Ned begins to fall for. The next morning, the Indians attack again. The group holds their own; the cavalry arrives and begins the movement of the Indians to the reservation. Ned still refuses to accompany his brother to San Francisco, but Johnny forces him onto the stagecoach, knocks Ben out and leaves the driver with him. Julie goes along. Inside the stagecoach office in Fort Defiance, Ned draws a gun on Johnny and begs him to not make him go. Seeing Ned's genuine desire to stay with Ben and Julie, he goes to the saloon where he tells Parker's man that Parker "as of this minute" has bought the Tallon ranch. Johnny demands a bill of sale and all the money in the saloon's cash register and safe. Parker's man argues and Johnny shoots him down. The bartender supplies Johnny with the money and bill of sale, which Johnny gives to Ben  - who has recovered and made his way to Fort Defiance - so he and Ned can start their ranch partnership.

Parker arrives and demands both Ned and Johnny come out. Johnny goes out, guns blazing and takes down all of Parker's men before being shot dead by Parker. Ben then kills Parker. A stagecoach arrives and Jane is on board. The four can now begin their new life.

Cast 
Dane Clark as Johnny Tallon
Ben Johnson as Ben Shelby
Peter Graves as Ned Tallon
Tracey Roberts as Julie Morse
George Cleveland as Uncle Charlie Tallon
Ralph Sanford as Jed Brown, Stagecoach Driver
Iron Eyes Cody as Brave Bear
Dennis Moore as Lt. Lucas
Craig Woods as Dave Parker
Dick Elliott as Kincaid
Bryan 'Slim' Hightower as Hankey 
Phil Rawlins as Les 
Jerry Ambler as Cheyenne
Kit Guard as Tracy
Wes Hudman as Stranger 
Hugh Hooker as Ed

References

External links 
 
 

1951 films
United Artists films
American Western (genre) films
1951 Western (genre) films
Films directed by John Rawlins
Films scored by Paul Sawtell
1950s English-language films
1950s American films